Albert Butler (born 1947/1948) is an American politician who is currently a Mississippi state senator. He was sworn into post in March 2010. Former Claiborne County supervisor Butler, a Democrat, was elected in a special vote to fill a senate seat left vacant when Butler's predecessor, Vincent Davis, was appointed a chancery judge. Butler is the Mississippi State Senator for the 36th district.

References

African-American state legislators in Mississippi
Living people
1940s births
Year of birth missing (living people)
Democratic Party Mississippi state senators
County supervisors in Mississippi
21st-century American politicians
21st-century African-American politicians